Men Are Such Fools is a 1932 American pre-Code drama film directed by William Nigh and written by Viola Brothers Shore and Ethel Doherty. The film stars Leo Carrillo, Vivienne Osborne, Una Merkel, Joseph Cawthorn and Tom Moore. The film was released on November 11, 1932, by RKO Pictures.

Plot summary

Cast 
 Leo Carrillo as Tony Mello
 Vivienne Osborne as Lilli Arno
 Una Merkel as Molly
 Joseph Cawthorn as Werner 
 Tom Moore as Tom Hyland
 Earle Foxe as Joe Darrow
 J. Farrell MacDonald as Prison Warden Randolph
 Paul Hurst as Stiles
 Albert Conti as Spinelli
 Paul Porcasi as Klepak 
 Edward Nugent as Eddie Martin
 Lester Lee as Giuseppe

References

External links
 
 
 
 

1932 films
American black-and-white films
RKO Pictures films
Films directed by William Nigh
1932 drama films
American drama films
1930s English-language films
1930s American films